Nicholas or Nick Saunders may refer to:

Politics
Nicholas Saunders (died 1587), MP for Bletchingley
Nicholas Saunders (died 1605), MP for Penryn, St Ives, Lostwithiel and Helston
Nicholas Saunders (died 1649), MP for Haslemere, Gatton and Winchelsea

Sports
 Clarence Saunders (athlete) or Nick Saunders (born 1963), Bermudian high jumper
 Nick Saunders (boxer), United States national amateur boxing bantamweight champion of 1944

Others
 Nicholas Saunders (activist) (1938–1998), British entrepreneur of the alternative culture and, later, MDMA (Ecstasy) advocate
 Nicholas Saunders (actor) (1913–2006), Ukrainian–American actor, theatre translator and stage manager
 Nicholas Saunders (vice-chancellor) (born 1946), Australian academic and Vice-Chancellor of the University of Newcastle, Australia
 Nicholas J. Saunders (born 1953), British academic archaeologist and anthropologist

See also 
 Nicholas Sanders (c. 1530–1581), English Roman Catholic priest and polemicist